Wout Zijlstra (born 4 August 1964, Wolsum) is a former strongman and Highland Games athlete from the Netherlands. He competed in the World's Strongest Man competition on two occasions, winning the 3rd place in 1998 behind Sweden's Magnus Samuelsson and Finland's Jouko Ahola.

Biography 
Zijlstra was born in Wolsum, Friesland. He managed his first podium finish at the Strongest man of the Netherlands in 1991 where he finished second after Ted van der Parre. It took him until 1994 to reach the podium again. This time he finished third after Ted van der Parre and Berend Veneberg. After this he finished several more times on the podium but it would take him until 2001 to finally win the tournament. After this victory he would not compete again and started focusing on Highland Games. He was invited twice to compete in the World's Strongest Man on both occasions he reached the final. In 1998 he competed together with his rival from the Netherlands Berend Veneberg and would finish third in the final. In 2001 he finished eight in the World's Strongest Man competition. Zijlstra competed together with Berend Veneberg on several occasions in the World's Strongest Team competition and won the tournament in 1998. After this they reached the podium several more times but did not win again. He finished the Elfstedentocht twice. Wout won the NK Highland Games in 2003 and 2004 and held the world record for the 56 lb. weight for height for more than a decade until it was finally beaten by Iceland's Hafþór Júlíus Björnsson. Zijlstra works as an inspector of meat and does security jobs. He is married and has 3 children.

Honours
third place World's Strongest Man (1998)
first place World's Strongest Team (1998) w/Berend Veneberg
first place Strongest man of the Netherlands (2001)
eighth place World's Strongest Man (2001)
first place NK Highland Games (2003)
first place NK Highland Games (2004)

References

External links
 Personal website
 Wout Zijlstra on realdutchpower.nl

1964 births
Living people
Dutch strength athletes
People from Wymbritseradiel
Sportspeople from Friesland